The East of Scotland Football League (EoSFL) is a senior football league based in the east and south-east of Scotland. The league sits at levels 6–9 on the Scottish football league system, acting as a feeder to the Lowland Football League.

Founded in 1923, it is currently composed of 60 member clubs competing in four divisions. Traditionally clubs were located in Edinburgh, Lothians and the Scottish Borders however the league has now expanded and also includes clubs from Clackmannanshire, Falkirk, Fife, Stirling, and Perth.

Since 2014–15 it has featured in the senior pyramid system. The winners take part in an end of season promotion play-off with the South of Scotland Football League and West of Scotland Football League champions, subject to clubs meeting the required licensing criteria.

History

Original EoSFL
An earlier East of Scotland League existed between 1896 and 1906, when the supplementary Edinburgh Football League changed its name, after accepting Dundee as a member. There is no connection between the two incarnations of the league.

21st Century
The EoSFL was traditionally one of Scotland's three "senior" non-leagues which sat outside the Scottish Football League (SFL), the other two being the Highland Football League and the South of Scotland Football League (SoSFL).  It was generally viewed as being weaker than the Highland League (with fewer of their club sides defeating SFL sides in the Scottish Cup competition as opposed to the HFL), but was still regarded as being stronger than the South of Scotland League.

Some SoSFL clubs opted to join the EoSFL, including Annan Athletic before they were elected to the SFL in 2008. Dalbeattie Star and Threave Rovers also joined however both subsequently left to rejoin the SoSFL and then later the Lowland League.

A number of the sides in the EoSFL have applied to join the SFL in the past, with Annan Athletic applying in (2000, successfully in 2008), Edinburgh City (2002, 2008), Gala Fairydean (1994, 2000, 2002), Preston Athletic (2000, 2002, 2008) and The Spartans (2008).

In 2004, Threave Rovers pulled out of the league to concentrate their efforts on the South of Scotland Football League. This left the league with an uneven number of clubs, and they were expected to fill the vacancy in the summer of 2005, with Gala Rovers widely touted as likely candidates. However, this did not happen. The only change that happened at that year's AGM of the league, was that Tollcross United announced that they would be competing as Tynecastle from the 2005-06 season.

In 2006, Peebles Rovers merged with several local amateur sides to become Peebles, who took Rovers' place in the league. At the 2007 AGM, agreement was reached to admit the reserve side of Berwick Rangers as the twelfth member of the First Division. They also entered the League Cup, but no other cups during the 2007–08 season. However, the reserves lasted only one season following Berwick Rangers' relegation to the fourth tier of Scottish football. They were replaced by Stirling University, but returned for the 2010–11 season.

Gretna 2008 entered the league in 2008, formed in the wake of the financial disaster that befell Gretna's former club, Gretna F.C. They initially had to play home matches in the nearby town of Annan, the club that took their place in the SFL.

The admission of Duns prior to the 2011–12 season, and then Burntisland Shipyard in 2012–13 brought the number of sides in the EoSFL to 26, the highest it had ever been at that point.

Lowland League and decline
In 2013, the Lowland Football League was formed to act as a direct feeder to the Scottish Professional Football League (SPFL), covering an area of Scotland south of the Tay Road Bridge. Nine EoSFL clubs gained entry to the Lowland League, reducing the EoSFL to 20 teams. Hibernian entered a reserve team into the league at the start of the 2013–14 season, but withdrew after one season due to their first team being relegated. Further departures saw the league merged into a single division of 16 teams in 2015–16, which was then reduced to just 11 teams during 2016–17 as more clubs moved to the Lowland League, Juniors or resigned.

Influx of Junior clubs
Beginning in 2017 the league experienced a resurgence with SJFA East Superleague champions Kelty Hearts joining from the Juniors. In April 2018, thirteen clubs—most of them from the East Juniors—were accepted into the league for the 2018-19 season, doubling the league's membership. When the window for applications was extended to the league's AGM in June, even more clubs quit the Junior grade, bringing the total membership up to 39 clubs, split over three conferences. The following season Glenrothes made the same switch. In 2020 a further ten clubs, including the return of Eyemouth United after a year out, boosted the league's membership to 49 clubs ahead of the 2020–21 season. The remaining East Region junior clubs south of Tayport (most from West Lothian) joined the league for 2021–22, giving the league a total of 59 members.

East of Scotland Football Association
While the EoSFL oversees the leagues and League Cup competitions; the East of Scotland Football Association (EoSFA) is a technically independent body, which organises all of the other cups. Most of the officials sit on both bodies, and the Executive Committee is a joint organisation. The current President of the EoSFA is Andy McDonald (of Edinburgh City), while the President of the EoSFL is John Greenhorn (of Ormiston).

There are 73 members of the East of Scotland Football Association (EoSFA).

 Five members play in the SPFL:
Bonnyrigg Rose Athletic
Edinburgh City
Heart of Midlothian
Hibernian
Kelty Hearts
9 members play in the Lowland League:
Berwick Rangers, Bo'ness United, Civil Service Strollers, Edinburgh University, Gala Fairydean Rovers, Gretna 2008, The Spartans, Stirling University, and Tranent Juniors.

The first teams of the members in the SPFL have little involvement in EoSFA competitions. Youth teams of Hearts and Hibernian formerly contested the East of Scotland Shield, while Bonnyrigg Rose, Edinburgh City, and Kelty Hearts participate in the East of Scotland (City) Cup Semi-finals. Berwick Rangers, Hibernian, and The Spartans all previously fielded reserve teams in the EoSFL.

The EoSFL and EoSFA are full members of the Scottish Football Association.

Member clubs

The EoSFL's two-tier format, which began in 1987–88, was abolished for the 2015–16 season due to dwindling numbers and replaced with a single division. To cope with the influx of new members in 2018-19, the league consisted of three conferences running in parallel. For 2019–20, the EoSFL was reorganised back into a two-tier setup, with a 16-team Premier Division and two First Division conferences. Due to the COVID-19 pandemic, no relegation took place in 2020 meaning the Premier Division was  temporarily increased to 18 clubs.

For 2022-23, the Premier Division reverted back to 16 clubs while the top 7 in the two First Division conferences formed a First and Second Division, with Conference X being renamed the Third Division below.

Listed below are the 60 clubs in the EoSFL for the 2022–23 season.

Premier Division
Blackburn United
Broxburn Athletic
Crossgates Primrose
Dundonald Bluebell
Haddington Athletic
Hill of Beath Hawthorn
Inverkeithing Hillfield Swifts
Jeanfield Swifts
Linlithgow Rose
Lothian Thistle Hutchison Vale
Musselburgh Athletic
Oakley United
Penicuik Athletic
Sauchie Juniors
Tynecastle
Vale of Leithen

First Division
Burntisland Shipyard
Camelon Juniors
Coldstream
Dunbar United
Dunipace
Glenrothes
Kennoway Star Hearts
Kinnoull
Kirkcaldy & Dysart
Leith Athletic
Lochore Welfare
Luncarty
Newtongrange Star
Preston Athletic
Rosyth
Whitehill Welfare

Second Division
Arniston Rangers
Craigroyston
Dalkeith Thistle
Easthouses Lily Miners Welfare
Edinburgh South
Edinburgh United
Hawick Royal Albert United
Heriot-Watt University
Lochgelly Albert
Newburgh
Ormiston
Peebles Rovers
St Andrews United
Stirling University reserves
Syngenta
Thornton Hibs
 Tweedmouth Rangers
Whitburn

Third Division
Armadale Thistle
Bathgate Thistle
Bo'ness Athletic
Edinburgh College
Fauldhouse United
Harthill Royal
Livingston United
Pumpherston
Stoneyburn
West Calder United

Cup competitions

Current
Scottish Cup: For full SFA members and winners of the East of Scotland League, who all enter at the preliminary round stage. Knock-out tournament, with replays until the quarter-finals.
SFA South Region Challenge Cup: This competition was introduced in 2007–08 as a replacement for the Scottish Qualifying Cup (South) which was abolished under the new Scottish Cup format. It is for all senior non-league clubs in the south of Scotland and has 165 entrants for the 2022–23 season - 16 from the Lowland League, 58 from the EoSFL, 12 from the SoSFL, and 79 from the WoSFL. Reserve teams do not take part. The first and second rounds are regionalised, otherwise it is a straight knock-out tournament, without replays.
East of Scotland League Cup: All EoSFL teams enter this competition. The format for the 2021-22 season has yet to be determined. Previously, only the group winners and runners-up from the Qualifying Leagues competed in this tournament.
King Cup: Open to the 44 clubs below the Premier Division. Straight knock-out tournament without replays. Previously, this was open to all EoSFL clubs. The King Cup final is traditionally the last game of the season.
Alex Jack Cup (formerly known as the East of Scotland Consolation Cup): Competition for the EoSFL clubs who are not already competing in the Scottish Cup or Scottish Junior Cup, usually played on the same weekends as Scottish Cup matches. Straight knock-out, without replays. The winner goes on to play in the East, South and West of Scotland Cup-Winners Shield against the Southern Counties FA's Alba Cup winner and the West's Strathclyde Cup winner for a place in the following season's Scottish Cup.
East of Scotland Qualifying Cup: Competition for the 68 EoSFA members outwith the SPFL. Straight knock-out tournament without replays.
East of Scotland (City) Cup: The finalists of the East of Scotland Qualifying Cup join Edinburgh City and Kelty Hearts in the semi-finals. The 4 EoSFA members in the national leagues (Hearts, Hibernian, Livingston, and formerly Berwick Rangers) used to all enter, but now the Hearts and Hibernian reserve teams contest the East of Scotland Shield - albeit intermittently.

Inactive
East of Scotland Shield: since the mid-1980s, this tournament has become a one-off match for youth/reserve teams of Hearts and Hibernian, however it was last held in 2015–16.
East of Scotland Qualifying Leagues: Removed for 2019–20 due to the increase in league fixtures. Added in 2011–12, this was a pre-season warm-up competition where clubs were split into ten groups and each played the others within their group once, with the group winners and runners-up progressing to the League Cup.

Holders
2021–22 winners unless stated.
South Region Challenge Cup: Auchinleck Talbot
East of Scotland League Cup: Linlithgow Rose
Alex Jack Cup: Luncarty (2022–23)
Cup Winners Shield: Drumchapel United
King Cup: Heriot-Watt University
East of Scotland Qualifying Cup: Linlithgow Rose
East of Scotland (City) Cup: Edinburgh City (2017–18)

Seasons

* Team promoted to the Lowland League

Total titles won
Clubs currently playing in the league are shown in bold.  Clubs no longer active are shown in italics.

References

External links
 Official website
 Final tables 1912-date

 
6
Scot
1923 establishments in Scotland
Sports leagues established in 1923
Football in Perth and Kinross
Football in Fife
Football in East Lothian
Football in Edinburgh
Football in Midlothian
Football in West Lothian
Football in Falkirk (council area)
Football in Clackmannanshire
Football in the Scottish Borders
Football in Stirling (council area)
Sport in Perth, Scotland
Football in Northumberland